Afghanistan has long been known for diverse wildlife. Many of the larger mammals in the country are categorized by the International Union for Conservation of Nature (IUCN) as globally threatened. These include the snow leopard, Marco Polo sheep, Siberian musk deer, markhor, urial, and the Asiatic black bear. Other species of interest are the ibex, the gray wolf, and the brown bear, striped hyenas, and numerous bird of prey species. Most of the Marco Polo sheep and ibex are being poached for food, whereas wolves, snow leopards and bears are being killed for damage prevention.

A leopard was recorded by a camera-trap in Bamyan Province in 2011. The long-lasting conflict in the country badly affected both predator and prey species, so that the national population is considered to be small and severely threatened. Between 2004 and 2007, a total of 85 leopard skins were seen being offered in markets of Kabul. Contemporary records do not exist for any of the smaller cat species known to have been present in the country, all of which were threatened already in the 1970s by indiscriminate hunting, prey depletion and habitat destruction.

Sampling Afghanistan's wildlife 

Altai weasel (Mustela altaica)
Asiatic black bear (Ursus thibetanus)
Asiatic brown bear (Ursus arctos)
Eurasian otter (Lutra lutra)
Geoffroy's bat (Myotis emarginatus)
Gray wolf (Canis lupus)
Hare (Lepus tolai)
Ibex (Capra sibirica)
Kashmir cave bat (Myotis longipes)
Leopard (Panthera pardus)
Lesser horseshoe bat (Rhinolophus hipposideros)
Long-tailed marmot (Marmota caudata)
Lynx (Lynx lynx)
Marco Polo sheep (Ovis ammon polii)
Markhor (Capra falconeri)
Mehely's horseshoe bat (Rhinolophus mehelyi)
Mouflon (or urial) (Ovis orientalis)
Pallas' cat (Otocolobus manul)
Pikas (Ochotona spp)
Red fox (Vulpes vulpes)
Sind bat (Eptesicus nasutus)
Snow leopard (Panthera uncia)
Stoat (Mustela erminea)
Stone marten (Martes foina)
Wild goat (Capra aegagrus)
Zarudny's jird (Meriones zarudnyi)

Extinct wildlife 

The Asiatic cheetah is considered to be extirpated in Afghanistan since the 1950s. Two cheetah skins were seen in markets in the country, one in 1971, and then in 2006. The latter was reportedly from Samangan Province.

The Caspian tiger used to occur along the upper reaches of Hari-Rud near Herat to the jungles in the lower reaches of the river until the early 1970s.

Uncertain is the historical presence of the Asiatic lion in the country, as locality records are not known. It is thought to have been present in southwestern and southern Afghanistan. In March 2017, border guards arrested and confiscated six white lions near Kandahar at the border to Pakistan. The origin of the lions was unclear at first, but Border Police Commander-General Ne'matullah Haidari said that they were from Africa. In April 2017, four of the lions were taken to Kabul Zoo. The other two lions are still in Kandahar Province.

See also 
 Environmental issues in Afghanistan

Notes

References

External links

 Fanged deer spotted in Afghanistan, first sighting in 60 years
 Elusive snow leopards discovered in remote corner of Afghanistan

Biota of Afghanistan
Afghanistan